is a Japanese politician of the Liberal Democratic Party (LDP), a member of the House of Councillors in the Diet of Japan. She is a descendant of Arimura Tsugizaemon, the ringleader of the Sakuradamon Incident, and Togo Heihachiro, the admiral of the Russo-Japanese War.

Early life and education
Haruko Arimura was born in Ishikawa Prefecture and grew up in Shiga Prefecture. Her father, Kunihiro (國宏) is a politician and descended from samurai of the Satsuma clan, Her grand grand father, Kunihiko (國彦) was a banker. Her uncle, Kunitaka Arimura (有村 國孝) is the inventor of Integrated Circuit Card. Her brothers, Kunitoshi (國俊) and Kunitomo (國知) Arimura are also politicians. Arimura family's Tūji (通字), the distinctive kanji used in the names of all men belonging to an Arimura family, is Kuni (國).

After graduating from Omi Brotherhood High School (近江兄弟社高等学校), she got a B.A. in social science from International Christian University (ICU) in Mitaka, Tokyo and received a M.A. in Conflict Transformation from School for International Training (SIT) in Vermont, United States.

He joined McDonald's Japan as a manager in 1997.

Political career
Arimura was elected for the first time in 2001. Having been elected to the House of Councillors, Arimura stopped the Ph.D. in international business programme at Aoyama Gakuin University.

On 3 September 2014, she was appointed by the Abe Cabinet as Minister of State for Regulatory Reform, Minister of State for Measures to Combat Declining Birthrates, Minister of State for Gender Equality and Minister of State for Consumer Affairs and Food Safety in the Cabinet Office. Arimura led the public relations department of the LDP during Prime Minister Yoshihide Suga's term, and was replaced on 4 October 2021 by Taro Kono at the start of Prime Minister Fumio Kishida's term.

She is affiliated to Nippon Kaigi.

Personal life 
She is married to a Hakka-Chinese Malaysian man and has two children with her husband.

References

Inline citations

Sources referenced

External links 
  in Japanese.

Members of the House of Councillors (Japan)
Aoyama Gakuin University alumni
Female members of the House of Councillors (Japan)
International Christian University alumni
People from Shiga Prefecture
Politicians from Ishikawa Prefecture
Living people
1970 births
SIT Graduate Institute alumni
Liberal Democratic Party (Japan) politicians
Members of Nippon Kaigi
McDonald's people
21st-century Japanese politicians
21st-century Japanese women politicians